The Bay of Pigs Monument is a monument in honor of the fallen of the Bay of Pigs Invasion in Little Havana, Miami, Florida. Their names are engraved on the monument, and there is an eternal flame at the top. The monument was dedicated on April 17, 1971, by "several hundred Cuban exiles" as well as Miami Mayor David T. Kennedy and then-Senator Lawton Chiles. President Richard Nixon "cabled his best wishes" for the occasion.

See also
Bay of Pigs Museum

References

1971 establishments in Florida
Buildings and structures in Miami
Cuban-American culture in Miami
Cuba–United States military relations
Monuments and memorials in Florida
Outdoor sculptures in Florida
Cold War military history of the United States